Due West may refer to:

 Due West, South Carolina
 Due West Female College
 Due West Railway
 Due West (band), American country band
 Due West: Our Sex Journey, 2012 Hong Kong film